The Leopold David House is a historical building located at 605 West Second Avenue in Anchorage, Alaska.  It is a -story bungalow-style house with a wooden frame structure. It features a front-gable roof and dormers.  The front facade is divided into two sections: the left with a projecting bay section, and the right with a gabled porch.  The roofs have deep eaves with Craftsman-style brackets.  The house was built about 1917 for Leopold David (1878-1924), an early resident of Anchorage and its first mayor, elected in 1920.  It is one of the best-preserved houses of the period in the city.

The house was listed on the National Register of Historic Places in 1986.

See also
National Register of Historic Places listings in Anchorage, Alaska

References

1917 establishments in Alaska
Houses completed in 1917
Bungalow architecture in Alaska
Houses in Anchorage, Alaska
Houses on the National Register of Historic Places in Alaska
Buildings and structures on the National Register of Historic Places in Anchorage, Alaska